Rosierodon is an extinct genus of morganucodont mammaliaforms from the Late Triassic of France. It contains a single species, Rosierodon anceps, which was named in 2015 based on several isolated lower molariforms discovered in Saint-Nicolas-de-Port.

References 

Morganucodonts
Prehistoric cynodont genera
Rhaetian life
Late Triassic synapsids of Europe
Triassic France
Fossils of France
Fossil taxa described in 2015